Dr. Monica is a 1934 American pre-Code melodrama film produced by Warner Bros. starring Kay Francis, Warren William, and Jean Muir. An obstetrician, who is unable to have children, discovers that the baby she is about to deliver was fathered by her husband.

Plot
Mary Hathaway gives birth to a baby girl delivered by Dr. Monica Braden. Monica discovers her husband, John, is the child's father. John is unaware his affair with Mary resulted in her pregnancy. Monica prepares to leave John by telling him she is going abroad. Mary learns that Monica knows the truth and decides to leave the child in Monica's care. Mary, a pilot, flies her plane over the ocean, which is later reported to have vanished. When John asks Monica about the baby, Monica lies making John believe the baby was abandoned by both parents. In contemplating their new role, Monica looks at John and says "She's yours," while John unknowingly smiles.

Cast

Censorship 
The censors at the Hays Office requested a large number of changes to the script before they would approve it for production. One of the major issues they had with the script was that it explicitly included dialogue about the potential dangers of childbirth.

Reception 
Mordaunt Hall, critic for The New York Times, wrote that Dr. Monica is "not especially suspenseful", but it "moves apace and the acting is excellent."

References

External links

1934 films
1934 romantic drama films
Adultery in films
American black-and-white films
American films based on plays
American romantic drama films
Films directed by William Keighley
Films directed by William Dieterle
Medical-themed films
Melodrama films
1930s pregnancy films
Warner Bros. films
American pregnancy films
1930s American films